"Bitches Ain't Shit" is the final song of Dr. Dre's debut solo rap album, The Chronic, which was released in December 1992 as Death Row Records' first album. Though never a single, "Bitches Ain't Shit" was a huge underground hit. The song's popularity was a major contribution to the success of The Chronic's sales.

The song proved controversial, due to prevalent themes of misogyny.

Record production

Death Row 
In 1986, Ice T's song "6 in the Mornin'," diverting from electro rap and "funk hop" some fanfare in the Los Angeles area's rap scene, was gangsta rap's inaugural anthem, reaching gold sales. Forming in early 1987, the group N.W.A recast gangsta rap into a grim, menacing presentation. Despite scarce radio play outside the County of Los Angeles, and despite two, early departures over money—secondary record producer Arabian Prince in 1988, then primary rapper and ghostwriter Ice Cube in late 1989—N.W.A advanced gangsta rap to platinum sales, but disbanded in 1991 once primary record producer Dr. Dre left. Freed from N.W.A's brash persona, Dre held creative control and preeminent industry cachet.

Dre wanted to only produce, but his N.W.A. ghostwriter the D.O.C. convinced him to still rap, too. Starting Death Row Records with their manager Suge Knight, they drew Dick Griffey, whose SOLAR Records had the office space, recording studio, and major distributor Sony Music. In April 1992, SOLAR issued their first rap song, "Deep Cover," which hit drew Sony's interest in Death Row. But soon, outrage at "Cop Killer," heavy metal, by Ice T's band Body Count, repelled Sony, as "Deep Cover" had similar theme. Death Row gained Warner Music distribution via Interscope Records. Knight excluded Griffey, and reportedly "Deep Cover" as album track was replaced by a newer song, "Bitches Ain't Shit."

The Chronic 
Assisted by Daz and by Warren G on drum programming and sampling soul and funk classics, Dre shaped a new sound, and new aura: gangsta funk, G-funk. In late 1993, Death Row Records' second album—Snoop Doggy Dogg's debut solo album Doggystyle—secured gangsta rap in mainstream, popular music. Yet in late 1992, there was Dr. Dre's debut solo album The Chronic. With key visual motifs in music videos, its sonic motifs, eerie yet elegant—with grooving bass lines and bassy thumps under catchy, melodic hooks and Snoop's relaxed, melodic raps—debuted gangsta rap on popular radio. "Nuthin' but a 'G' Thang" pervaded it, and was a 1994 Grammy nominee, while "Let Me Ride" won a Grammy. "Bitches Ain't Shit," while similarly musical, was "gruff" and "sinister" and yet comedic, a gonzo style.

Album recording, across nine months in 1992, began in Calabasas, California, in Dre's house—which in late June sustained severe fire damage—but mainly occurred in the City of Los Angeles section Hollywood at the studio Galaxy Sound, owned by SOLAR Records' owner Dick Griffey. Its audio console was advanced, yet its neighborhood had was suffering urban decay, and from late April to early May was beset by the L.A. riots. Guest rapper and studio fixture Kurupt questioned "what kind of album The Chronic would have been without the riots." Recording, he says, "was coming from the middle of it all." In any case, "Bitches Ain't Shit" was among "the most hard-hitting songs on The Chronic." For the album's 2001 reissue, the song was added to the track list as a proper song, unlike in 1992,  where it was included as a hidden track on the album.

Instruments

Synthesis 
In the album's 1992 issue, after the final listed track, "The Roach," subtitled "The Chronic Outro," is a long silence. Opening the truly final but unlisted track, Snoop intones, a capella, "Bitches ain't shit but hos and tricks"—the hook's first line, spanning the four metrical beats that occur during one bar—trailed by a breakbeat, spanning the second bar, from the band Trouble Funk's 1982 hit "Let's Get Small." Then opening, to loop once per bar, is the rhythm section—a cymbal strike solely on the one count or the primary downbeat, which also meets a kick drum's bassy thump that returns aflutter, syncopating offbeat, between a snare drum's lively taps, steady, syncopating backbeat, namely, on the two count and the four count, while a bass guitar's grooving bass line, a riff that is the replayed start of Funkadelic's 1976 song "Adolescent Funk," spans the bar—while both backbeats also meet a chord perhaps on synthesized keys. Simultaneously, an eerie, highpitched whine or ring, a type of motif called "the funky worm" and created on a Moog synthesizer—a keyboard that can synthesize bass, too—manifests while Snoop, restarting from its first line, raps the full hook. It has four lines, each a bar. As he restarts the full hook, a sample emerges—to recur often in the song—from New York City rapper MC Shan's 1986 hit "The Bridge." Starting the 11th bar is Dre's verse.

Backstory 
Bass guitarist Colin Wolfe was first hired by Dre at Ruthless Records for its R&B singer Michel'le. Wolfe played the bassline also on Dre's debut solo single, "Deep Cover." In 2014, Wolfe recalled, "One day, I was alone in the control room and Dre and Daz were up in the back room, trying to mess around on the keyboard for the 'Bitches Ain't Shit' bass line. So I stepped in the doorway and I could hear what they were trying to do. I said, 'Man, look out, y'all trying to do this.' I straight did it, recorded it, and then I was like, 'Yo, I got another part,' and did the high Moog part right after that."

Via the funk group Ohio Players' 1972 single "Funky Worm," such a "high Moog part" is nicknamed "the funky worm" and made on a Moog synthesizer, also behind Bernie Worrell's otherworldly P-Funk sounds. With N.W.A, Dre released two songs employing it—Ice Cube, in 1987, rapping "Dope Man," and Dre with MC Ren, in 1991, rapping "Alwayz into Somethin' "—a signature sound of The Chronic. A leading record producer of 1980s pop rock, Jimmy Iovine, who granted the album major distribution, recalls, "Dre's sonics just sounded better than anything else on my speakers."

Vocals

Backstory 
Dre's verse was written by the D.O.C., his usual ghostwriter, a rapper whom Dre discovered in Dallas, and who helped Dre form Death Row Records. The four "Bitches Ain't Shit" guest vocalists, unsigned and poor, frequented the studio like a social club. Snoop's circle brought his younger cousin Daz and Kurupt—soon a rap duo, Tha Dogg Pound—while R&B singer Jewell, already present, hereby pioneered women's singing on gangsta rap. Yet most prominent is Snoop. In early 1991, Dre drew Snoop, who would turn 20 in October, from the Long Beach, California, trio 213: Snoop, his cousin Nate Dogg, singer, and Warren G, producer and rapper, stepbrother of Dre.

In April 1992, unheard since N.W.A's May 1991 album and breakup, Dr. Dre reemerged by a debut solo single—title track of the film Deep Cover—while debuting a guest but in essence lead rapper, Snoop Doggy Dogg. Despite intense anticipation for Snoop, his album recorded awaited release Dre's, which largely doubled as Snoop's debut album. Early on, working with Snoop to write the "Nuthin' but a 'G' Thang" lyrics, the D.O.C. focused, beyond Dre's verses, on imparting to Snoop, already gifted, an extra lyricism, "the formula." Snoop brought from Long Beach an intoxicated, lighthearted gangsterism, and the elders coached him, sealing the aura that this team would mint.

Arrangement 
The four "Bitches Ain't Shit" male rappers' vocals never skip a beat—effecting teamwork, like a tag team—Snoop's hook of 4 bars twice, Dre's verse of 16 bars, Daz's verse of 8 bars, Snoop's hook of 4 bars once, Kurupt's verse of 12 bars, Snoop's verse of 22 bars, and Snoop's hook of 4 bars twice. During the latter two of the song's three hook sections, a nondescript but male voice, whispering below Snoop's vocals, incessantly chimes, "Bitches ain't shit"—at least twice per bar—fleeting across the stereo field, voicing on the left, then on the right, then in the center, back and forth. After the song's final hook recital, rapper Dre, silent since the first verse, reenters on the next beat, which starts the next bar, by starkly deadpanning, "Bitches ain't shit." Reverb effect echoes Dre's declaration across the full bar till the following bar's first beat. On this beat, Jewell's vocals enter, effecting an R&B outro—initially wordless Wooo'ing for two bars—and then her first clear word, if mere ad lib, is on her own third bar's first beat as she sings, "Yeah."

In vocal metre, or timing of stresses, which often rhyme, the rap verses mostly include stress on the bar's last beat, the four count, whereas Jewell's singing most stresses the first beat, the one count, the strongest bass and only cymbal attack. By this, Jewell's first line, I don't give a fuck about a bitch, gathers from her third bar's last beat to peak on her fourth bar's first beat, when she sings "fuck" while Dre states "bitches." First heard four bars earlier, Dre's deadpanned Bitches ain't shit—now echoing across Jewell's first full bar of lyrics—proves to be a refrain, issued across every fourth bar. Jewell, unperturbed, sings of her own outlook and lifestyle until exposing one tenet. In four straight bars, she stresses at beat one the line's last word when belting, "And I don't give a fuck!"—the first time here, Dre's refrain adding bitches—and then, switching to sexual theme, she raps, switching stress to beat three, then to beat four. Her final few words abruptly go a cappella and, echoing, fade out while Dre's refrain, still on time, returns once more and fades across two bars echoing.

Lyrical content

Dr. Dre's verse
Based on an early rap feud, Dre's verse never directly comments on women. Rather, complementing brief skits and the single "Fuck wit Dre Day," it is the album's final smear of Eazy-E. Dre's former N.W.A groupmate, Eazy had founded the group and owned its label, Ruthless Records. Never identifying Eazy by his stage name, Dre's lyrics identify him first by his legal name, Eric Wright, but otherwise call him "bitch" and "she." These jabs attend Dre's glossing their music alliance and friendship amid Compton nightlife, followed by nationwide success with hit songs while they grew apart, and ultimately Wright's lawsuit against Dre, allegedly resulting since, Dre raps, "bitch can't hang with the street." Tracing the turning point to Wright's, more specifically, "hanging with a white bitch"—unnamed in the song's lyrics—Dre thus alludes to veteran music manager Jerry Heller, counting N.W.A among his clients. Wright and Heller—manager of Dre's first group, too, the World Class Wreckin' Cru—had cofounded Ruthless.

(In real life, feeling underpaid as an N.W.A rapper and Ruthless Records' prime record producer, Dre, although signed as exclusive to the label, left it. Dre teamed with the D.O.C. and their manager Suge Knight to form Death Row Records. But Eazy sued, alleging that Suge had coerced the April 1991 release of three artists—Dre with girlfriend Michel'le and the D.O.C.—Death Row's legal jeopardy whereby the label lost Epic Records distribution under Sony Music. Then at Dre's offer of The Chronic with artwork and video concepts nearly complete, other labels stonewalled him, until Jimmy Iovine, excited by its sound, took on the legal imbroglio and took Death Row into Interscope Records distribution by Warner Music. By a legal settlement, Interscope owed Ruthless part of Dre's earnings for six years, and the independent giant Priority Records, an early distributor for Ruthless, became The Chronic's official seller. Eazy's musical retort—"Real Muthaphuckkin G's"—became his biggest solo hit.)

Guest verses

Daz & Kurupt
Although both touting hedonism, Daz, operating systematically, like a gigolo, stalks profit and eyes leisure, whereas Kurupt, derisively mistrustful, chases sheer thrills. Here, women resemble a faceless breed of indulgent but disloyal nymphomaniacs, who if shown men's affection would repay it by becoming the men's adversities as traitors and perhaps parasites.

Daz, before heralding Snoop's hook recital as "the anthem," advises best practices to grow relaxation time with "your homies." In Daz's protocol, "you pick a ho who got the cash flow," and "run up in them hos and grab the cash and get your dash on." Once the hook soon closes, "Then I hops in my coupé to make a quick run," Kurupt adds, "To the sto'—to get me a 4-O."

Kurupt, out to buy a 40 oz. bottle of malt liquor, gets paged by Snoop. "That must mean," Kurupt knows, "more hos." His outing to Snoop's hometown Long Beach—"just so I can meet a freak to lick me from my head to my feet," Kurupt beams—swiftly attracts, he prides, "bitches on my nuts like clothes." But, in his circle, "we don't love them hos": "a ho's a trick"; "a trick's a bitch."

Snoop Dogg
Snoop skims a saga of finding himself as "a nigga on sprung," "up in them guts like every single day," and "in love like a motherfucker," walking into his debacle with her, "a bitch named Mandy May." Early on, despite "the homies" advising him that she was "no good," he had "figured that niggas wouldn't trip with mine," his being, after all, "the maniac in black, Mr. Snoop Eastwood." But, "on a hot, sunny day," his "nigga D.O.C." and "homie Dr. Dre," retrieving him from a jail stint, pose, "Snoop, we got news."

Now wise to her "tricking" during his "county blues," Snoop, who "ain't been out a second," already must inflict some "chin checkin.' " So he pulls up to "my girl's house," he says, and will "kick in the door," but first goes, "Dre, pass the Glock." At the doorstep, drawn to "look on the floor," Snoop finds, "It's my little cousin Daz, and he's fucking my ho"—a discovery that prompts Snoop to "uncock" the pistol. Snoop admits, but affirms, "I'm heartbroke, but I'm still loc," and, at long last, swears Mandy May off: "Man, fuck a bitch."

Public reception

The hidden jam
"Bitches Ain't Shit," in predating the cultural effects of Snoop's debut solo or November 1993 album, met a society that, despite misogynistic rap lyrics by Too Short and by 2 Live Crew since the 1980s, still expected popular songs, rather, to romanticize women. Although too hardcore to be a Chronic single, it was among the album's "unheralded favorites," spurring talk of "the beat"—that is, the whole instrumental stream—and of the "flow" by vocals, whereby Snoop's, mellow in the era, at times hinted singing. Altogether, this hidden track, a huge underground hit, as explains its guest rapper Kurupt, "was one of the things that helped sell The Chronic the most."

Interviewed, asked her sentiments on "Bitches Ain't Shit," one young woman, incidentally black, echoed many women's view by commenting, "I shouldn't like it, but I love the song 'cause it's the jam." In October 1993, rap journalist Dream Hampton, remarking aside the controversy over it, called it, in the rap genre, "the best song on the best album of a pretty slow year." Surveying the genre across 1993, music critic Alan Light called the album a "sonic masterpiece." Since the November 1992 release of "Nuthin' but a 'G' Thang," the album's singles, lyrically mild, pervading popular radio, shifted the rap genre's spotlight, for the first time, from the East Coast or New York to the West Coast. The Chronic, rapidly, "recast hip hop in the mold of L.A. rap."

Snoop was charged with involvement in a homicide in August 1993, but was bailed out continued becoming one of America's biggest superstars.  "Bitches Ain't Shit" was notorious, but began reshaping popular music's culture. But meanwhile, even some rap fans still disputed that rap songs, being strongly rhythmic, often sampling other songs, and allegedly not melodic, are in fact music. "Bitches Ain't Shit" critique usually exclaimed either "the beat" or the "flow"—end of the analysis—or anxiety and allegation at its lyrics written in prose format. Expert analysis of the musicality in rap songs' construction, including metric and rhythmic structures within Snoop's style was mostly beyond a "poorly conversant music public," reading about controversial lyrics.

Public opposition

The runup 
All in 1990, many rap records gained the Parental Advisory label, Newsweek smeared rappers as, in one reading, "ignorant black men who scream obscene threats," and in Florida a federal judge, triggering ban laws, ruled a rap album, As Nasty as They Wanna Be, obscene, US history's first in music. But, hearing the lewd party music in court, jurors laughed, and acquitted the group, 2 Live Crew. By contrast, recorded amid the 1992 Los Angeles riots, The Chronic reflects this climate—anger, angst, and mayhem, present in Dre's life, too—interspersed by visions of leisurely life for a West Coast rap "G." For the December 1992 album release by Death Row Records, its intermediary label, Interscope Records—cued by its own parent, Time Warner's major label, Warner Music—had Dre remove the track "Mr. Officer," whose hook wishes a policeman's death. In October 1992, rapper Tupac Shakur, Interscope Records, and Time Warner had been sued for the April 11 fatal shooting of a Texas Highway Patrol officer.

In June 1992, homicide on an undercover, corrupt detective already themed Dre's debut solo single "Deep Cover," a hit issued in April—by Dick Griffey's SOLAR Records, a soul label in Los Angeles, via Epic Records under major label Sony Music—but national outrage arose, instead, about a March release by a side project of L.A.'s original gangsta rapper, Ice T. "Cop Killer," on his band Body Count's eponymous album of heavy metal music, was condemned by US Vice President Dan Quayle, US President George H. W. Bush, and the NRA. Time Warner, also owning the Six Flags amusement parks, faced boycott threats. By August, about 1 000 stores withdrew the album. Sire Records, whose roster included Madonna as well as Ice T since his 1987 debut in major distribution, cancelled his new rap album. In January 1993, Sire's owner, Warner Brothers Records—itself owned by Warner Music—freed all Body Count artists from contract. Yet after The Chronic, despite a related, civilian homicide in June 1993, opposition regrouped about misogyny.

Harlem rallies 
On Sunday, May 9, 1993, in his Mother's Day sermon, senior pastor Calvin Butts—leading the Abyssinian Baptist Church, in New York City's Harlem section—vowing a symbolic act, solicited offending music samples. Butts thus became the first black public figure to decry gangsta rap. On Saturday, June 5, amid a few hundred supporters outside of Abyssinian—historically the city's largest and preeminent black church—Reverend Butts, as vowed, mounted a steamroller. But dozens of counterprotesters, decrying censorship, blocked its path. One shouted, "You're steamrolling our dreams," and "who we are." Another alleged, "He's attacking us black rappers," not "the white power structure." Skipping ahead to the preplanned finale, then, Butts and followers, taking the boxes of CDs and tapes unexpectedly unscathed, boarded a bus to Midtown Manhattan.

On the 550 Madison Avenue sidewalk, they laid, and some trampled, the boxes of gangsta rap. There, at Sony Music headquarters, "representative of an industry which," Butts felt, "laughs at black people all the way to the bank," he blared, over megaphone, "Recognize that this poison kills!" But that summer in Harlem, young men casually wore T-shirts emblazoned Bitches ain't shit but hos and tricks. Eventually, some two dozen women organized, and for three days on the thoroughfare 125th Street aimed megaphones demanding that street vendors withdraw the shirts. Such apparently sold on Los Angeles sidewalks, too, maybe till 1995. By then, Reverend Butts—who, romanticizing "the black community," had called gangsta rap "antithetical to what our culture represents"—had receded from the battle. But in 1994, US Congress had invited Butts to speak about gangsta rap.

National battle 
In September 1993, C. Delores Tucker, chair and 1984 founder of the National Political Congress of Black Women, a lobbying group in Washington, DC, reentered the public eye to take up the battle against gangsta rap. Swiftly becoming the battle's national leader, she expanded it against offensive rock lyrics, too, but especially targeted "Bitches Ain't Shit," The Chronic, and Death Row Records. Of a background in civil rights activism and state political office, Tucker demanded congressional hearings. Illinois representative Cardiss Collins, already chair of Congress' standing committee on commerce and consumer protection, convened them in 1994 on February 11. There, Tucker called gangsta rap, especially Snoop's, "pornographic smut." Congress convened again for the inquiry on May 5. No government action ensued. Tucker, a Democrat, soon teamed, however, with Republican conservative, onetime US education secretary, William Bennett.

In May 1995, Tucker and Bennett aired a TV commercial, in four major cities, attacking Time Warner, and gained an ally in Senate majority leader, Republican presidential candidate, Bob Dole. Time Warner called them political opportunists, but divested from Death Row's intermediary, Interscope Records. Interscope's 1991 cofounder Jimmy Iovine was promptly dined by four of the other five major labels, the then Big Six's rivals to Warner Music. At Interscope's options, Iovine reacted, "I'm just happy we got our company back." Interscope chose MCA, soon renamed Universal. Suge Knight, too, expressed relief, and his Death Row label, unfazed, steamrolled onward. In the late 1990s, as G-funk's era closed, The Chronic grew into a popular classic. And yet "Bitches Ain't Shit" would refuel recurring rebuke and debate over this slang term for women, such depictions of them, and, more broadly, its album's pivotal role in popularizing the values of idealized street gangsters.

Female listeners
Bay Area rapper Too Short had smeared types of women since 1985, or 1983, more vaguely. "Bitches Ain't Shit" apparently "scorned all women," and "presented misogyny with an explanation." Although the words bitch and ho can be playful or even loving, the song scorns any trust or love for such. While many were instantly offended, women fond of the song often explained, "It's not about me." Especially from women, a near apology emerged: Oh, I just like the beat. But in one view, this adopts a sexist stereotype: "men work the intellect, and women work the body." At least some girls who ignored accosts by passerby boys were harassed by chants from the hook.

In perhaps 1995, a New York rap mogul promoted a party where one Sarah Jones was, "like some video ho, singing along to 'bitches ain't shit but hos and tricks.' " She noticed, "This is not me. You know, I disagree!' " Wistful for classic hip hop, she wrote a poem, "Your Revolution," its motif Your revolution will not happen between these thighs. Read as slam poetry, it helped her get an Off-Broadway show, and in 2000 was televised on cable TV series Def Poetry Jam. DJ Vadim then produced a version to music. In 2001, the Federal Communications Commission, deeming it indecent, fined a Portland radio station for playing it, but reversed after Jones became the first artist ever to sue the FCC.

In 1995, Dream Hampton, about her first writing assignment, reviewing the debut or 1990 album of H.W.A., or Hoes With Attitudes, recalled "boys' most twisted notions of womanhood—that 'bitches ain't shit but hoes and tricks.' " The Source's September 1993 issue has Hampton profiling Snoop but noting, "Women like him because of, not in spite of, his verse on 'Bitches Ain't Shit,' " among her own "two favorite songs this summer." New York rapper Jadakiss, a man, called women the "main ones" seeking "entertainment" by Snoop and "that 'Bitches Ain't Shit' shit." In 2008 in Detroit, a female open mic's planning held a female focus group, which, scorning the proposed name, advised Bitches Ain't Shit.

In 2015, chairperson of theatre arts Amy Cook, in research on casting, indulged her urge "to sing along about how 'bitches ain't shit.' " Her own dissimilarity, being white and female, versus from the rappers, thus her likelihood to get cast as "one of the various 'bitches,' " expands her "leap" into an "outlaw" persona fit to counter any threat. "I take on the position of the powerful, the angry, the sad, the person aggrieved by 'bitches.' " Further, amid the female/male distinction's social primacy, when beholding such a "strategic miscasting, or counter casting," Cook explains, "the spectators must consider the nature of their expectations." Cook finds, then, "a cultural power in the counter casting."

Cultural integration

Snoop effect 
In 1990, rappers MC Lyte as well as Queen Latifah, both icons and female, discredited gripes about misogyny in rap. Lyte, 19, rejecting protest at the word bitch, advised women to just end their own fandom of rappers like Too Short and N.W.A. Latifah, 20, traced allegedly sexist lyrics to real types of women. Yet on N.W.A.'s final or May 1991 album, in the song "One Less Bitch," mostly a Dr. Dre rap, Eazy-E says, in part, "a fool is one who believes that all women are ladies. A nigga's one who believes that all ladies are bitches. And all bitches are created equal." "To me, all bitches ain't shit!" The Source chief editor Kim Osario recalls, "Once Snoop said, 'Bitches ain't shit,' it was a wrap for us."

Vibe's debut issue, September 1993, has Snoop in its cover story reasoning that his debut "Deep Cover" evaded what scandal beset Ice T's "Cop Killer" by his own hook's using a police code for homicide, 1-8-7. As to his infamous hook, interviewer Kevin Powell "cornered" him about bitch meaning "women" or, allegedly, "black women." Snoop reportedly answered, "It’s just a word, you know, that you grew up with. It's some shit that’s hard to shake." Ice T, later discussing Snoop, likened ghetto idiom's bitch to nigga, disputed the gravity that outsiders impute to ho, and posed, "All men are dogs. How many times have you heard women say that?" "Bitches Ain't Shit" may be some fallout from that slur.

Dre's carefully crafted "G"—a sociable street gangsta ever at leisure until violent on threats to his comforts and privileges—spawned untold copycatting. And the "Bitches Ain't Shit" track—"the final wisdom Dr. Dre left us on The Chronic"—lays bare the basic values of the aura. This was refined in Snoop's breakthrough, early rap brand, intoxicated on alcohol and marijuana, mellow and debonair, but, while loyal to the homies, guntoting and misogynistic. Amid the rap genre's snowballing corporate consolidation underway, Snoop's persona fed rap's massive commercialization, like his endorsements of St. Ides malt liquor and Tanqueray gin, in the 1990s. Traditional R&B rapidly diminished.

In 1999, rap magazine Ego Trip named "16 Memorable Misogynist Rap Music Moments." They date to 1985: the pioneer, Too Short, still at #3, "The Bitch Sucks Dick." Ahead of that, the #2 moment, is "Bitches Ain't Shit." This trails only Snoop with, the next year, more male camaraderie and teamwork, now featuring Warren G, Nate Dogg, and again Kurupt: the Doggystyle track "Ain't No Fun (If the Homies Can't Have None)." Also never a single, yet another huge underground hit, "Ain't No Fun" is often recalled with "Bitches Ain't Shit." Snoop's second underground hit swiftly fulfilled what Snoop's first had presaged: the end of popular music's tenacious idealization of women.

Female reply 
Ahead of Beyoncé as solo icon, Vibe profiled the lead singer's R&B group Destiny's Child. "Chockful of sophisticated, ball-busting, and often comical hits that berated brothers," its second or June 1999 album, The Writing's on the Wall, "earned the group reputations for being everything from gold-digging male bashers—a charge the girls heatedly deny—to new-millennium feminists out to challenge the bitches-ain't-shit posturing that plagued much of late-'90s R&B and hip hop," recalls the February 2001 issue. By contrast, of March 2000, rapper Trina's debut album Da Baddest Bitch imparts "sexually explicit tales riddled with braggadocio and vulgarity." Late to reply, Trina redoes the 1992 hook's fellatio as her "Niggas ain't shit" hook's cunnilingus directive. Yet in 1996, rapper Lil' Kim, by a track name on her debut solo album Hard Core, hailed herself as the "Queen Bitch." And though Canadian singer/rapper Peaches' 2003 effort to offend American men may appear stunted by patriarchy, Lil' Kim's second or July 2000 album answers "Bitches Ain't Shit" artfully.

Lil' Kim's 2000 song "Suck My Dick" is, in English professor Greg Thomas's view, an "anti-sexist faceoff" where Lil' Kim "talks back," delivering "a royal reply," to the 1992 "classic" and "flips its sexual script," such that ultimately, "Snoop and Dre get tricked themselves, lyrically." Lil' Kim interpolates their 1992 hook's four bars only to finish her final verse and segue to her own hook, original. Her hook, a duo with a man—his only vocals—is after each of her three verses. In verse one, Lil' Kim identifies with enterprising, ghetto, intoxicated women, boasts of combat prowess and sexual power, but poses, "Imagine if I was dude, and hitting cats from the back." Soon aping a man, she is still rapping, " 'Ey, yo, yo, come here so I can bust in your mouth"—how she closes verse one—when a man, starting the hook over her vocals, yells, " 'Ey, yo, come here, bitch." Thus dragged into the hook, she snaps, "Nigga, fuck you," is asked, "Why you acting like a bitch?"—her reply, 'Cause y'all niggas ain't shit—and her hook's own fellatio directive, hypothetical, is what, "if I was a dude, I'd tell y'all."

In verse two, Lil' Kim, supplier of many intoxicants, wants only money and cunnilingus, but "got this nigga now" who, tipsy, "asked me did I love him." Aping a demeaning vocal sample in 2 Live Crew's hook of "Me So Horny"—on 1989 album As Nasty as They Wanna Be—Lil' Kim replied, "I love you long time," got "some head" and "the piss sucked out" without requiting, and secretly recorded it to show her "girls." Ending verse two, she brags, "Niggas know he gave me all his cake"—a double entendre for money—"I peeled the Benji's off and threw the singles back in his face." Thomas reads, "The male 'nigga' is now"—derided by the stripper—"the 'trick' who gets done." In verse three, a "dude named Jaleel," seeming a rich socialite, offered Lil' Kim "10 grand just to belly dance" and "come all over his pants," but "showed up with his homeboy named Julio," and "was a phony." Recalling her gun in his mouth—Fool, give me my money!—she relabels him "just a nigga frontin'." She chimes, "Niggas ain't shit, but they can still trick," and limits them to sucking till she climaxes and jumps up.

Pop revised 
In 2003, Lil' Kim reemerged with her third solo album and her "Queen B" persona, leading women's effort—perhaps first attempted near 1970—to reappropriate the word bitch, this time amid lingering "Bitches Ain't Shit" ethos. Proclaiming the title bitch, women blunted the slur and reframed it to buoy their own ambitions. But since their 1996 albums, both Lil' Kim and, debuting then, her main rap contemporary female, Foxy Brown—who would slur each other as various types of "bitch"—had employed profane boasts of vanity and lewdness, avarice and violence, more gangsta rap. (The 1974 blaxploitation film Foxy Brown's beautiful, indomitable protagonist regained currency in 1995, after her cameo in a Snoop music video of 1994.) By allegedly roundabout reinforcement of "Bitches Ain't Shit," both rappers were accused of "resurrecting Jezebel"—purportedly endemic stereotypes of women, especially of black women—a model sustained since 2010 by Nicki Minaj and 2015 by Cardi B. In any case, Lil' Kim's persona stressed loyalty—especially to her one "nigga"—and in some ways grew women's senses of liberties. Per a 2009 analysis, Lil' Kim's 2000 song "Sucky My Dick"—retorting "Bitches Ain't Shit"—"moves beyond any rigid gender or sexual identity."

Meanwhile, during 2002, certain singers, rather, including Usher and Alicia Keys, were leading a revitalization of R&B's soul tradition, after a decade of the rap genre, with its "Bitches Ain't Shit" model, invading the R&B genre. But by 2005, in the rap genre itself, "Bitches Ain't Shit" had seemingly stood, as New York rapper Jadakiss would hyperbolize, "since the beginning of time." And yet, in 2012, at The Chronic's 20th anniversary, Billboard magazine still found, at this track, "an elephant in the room here: the misogyny is ugly and thick, even for a rap record," as "women are treated like disposable sperm receptacles." The album was, by then, both a rap classic and a popular classic, anyway, roundly celebrated at its 25th anniversary. "A misogynistic hip-hop masterpiece and relic of the past," wrote one music journalist during the commemoration. Another journalist, meanwhile, called it "rap's world-building masterpiece." In 2020, the Library of Congress entered it in the National Recording Registry. By then, music artists of over 40 songs had borrowed from "Bitches Ain't Shit." In the process, it had become, additionally, "a gorgeous piano ballad"—a 2008 description of the 2005 cover version by rock artist Ben Folds—which entered the main popular songs chart, the Billboard Hot 100.

Ben Folds cover version

Development 
In July 2003, Ben Folds issued an EP, which covered the Cure's 1985 song "In Between Days." In 2005, still writing solo but again playing as a trio of piano, drums, and bass, Folds had his second solo studio album, Songs for Silverman, set for April 26 release by Epic Records. For the lead single, "Landed," issued on February 1, he sought a B side. Having wanted since college to put a melody to rap group Public Enemy's 1990 song "Can't Do Nuttin' for Ya, Man", he soon "found it too symmetrical for a good melody," effecting "too much of a Cat in the Hat vibe to sound serious with sad chords."

Folds sought in his rap collection a classic with vocals more varying from English poetry's classic metre, iambic pentameter. He found "Bitches Ain't Shit," chose only Dr. Dre's and Snoop Dogg's lyrics"—thus omitting the other three verses, whose boasting, gloating, and slurring impart most of the misogyny—slowed the tempo, and, Folds says, "just added pretty chords and one of my best melodies." With only Dre's and Snoop's sagas of endured betrayal, the hook—chiming "ain't shit but hos and tricks" best fit to "suck the dick"—sounds, in Folds's view, "like a sad Johnny Cash song with a lot more vulgarity."

In some views, his piano version, alike a minstrel show, mocks blacks, or, exposing "musical misogyny" as "absurd bullshit," takes the original, "flips it on its head, and makes Dr. Dre look like an idiotic buffoon." Yet by consensus, it parodies Ben Folds "whiteness." "It's touchy," he says, "because someone could say, 'You think all rap is like this.' But no, it's specifically gangsta rap." Calling his own genre "punk rock for sissies," he depicts a man "hurt" or "wrecked." About the rap song, he asserts, "Dr. Dre is no dummy: there's comedy in it, there's Quentin Tarantino, and then there's also serious stuff in it."

Composition 
The cover version, while importing lyrics, is a new composition. Ben Folds on piano, Lindsay Jamieson on drum kit, and Jared Reynolds on bass guitar, the song sounds like classic Ben Folds until the middle eight—traditionally, an interlude of eight bars markedly diverting from the song's established sound—which adds a synthesizer, played at high pitch, evoking the rap song's eerie ring ubiquitous, "the funky worm." More specifically, where the Snoop verse recalls abrupt separation from his beloved "bitch named Mandy May" by jail time, the rap song—whose funky worm simply endures—reintroduces "The Bridge" instrumental sample, which plays across these two bars. Lacking a sample to reintroduce there, the rock song starts its middle eight, commonly but perhaps falsely called "the bridge" of a song. These eight bars also span release from jail, "news" about his "girl," and need to assault whomever the complicit man. Thereafter, the Dre song's Snoop verse—totaling 22 lyrical lines arranged on 22 musical bars—spans six more lines/bars, which meanwhile vary the bass riff.

In the rap Snoop verse, his journey to her house and arrival with handgun span two bars of bass riff absent, then his kicking the door in and shock by the sight span two bars of bass riff halted—with the bass strings strummed till each bar's midpoint but there stopped of resonance—whereas his uncocking the gun and forsaking "a bitch" span two bars of bass riff normal, how it remains in Snoop's immediate hook recital, then, and thereafter. By contrast, the rock song's bass play at car ride and gun grab rests except to attack both orthodox stresses—the one and the three of four counts per bar—and likewise at door kick, but upon the sight, all music play vanishes for a bar. The next two bars play only a chord of treble keys—struck near beat one, and then only resonating—while Folds, newly speaking, covers uncocking, but omits forsaking. This bar has covered the line's only first half: I'm heartbroke, but I'm still loc'd. The next bar is silent till beat two, when a bandmate finishes the line—Man, fuck that bitch—and then cues "three, four," how the next beat unites the band in full attack and singing of the Snoop hook.

Yet two choruses—the known Snoop hook and a new Dre hook—play in the cover. More specifically, Dre's verse, still the song's first verse, loses its closing line—So recognize, then pass to Daz—while its prior three lines/bars are rearranged as four bars and phrased as a hook. Before this, the song opens with Folds on piano keys sparsely—only one chord every half bar—then resting while his bandmates speak, "Bitches ain't shit." Folds then sings, solo, the Snoop hook and then Dre's verse, which closes as the Dre chorus joined by singing bandmates. Jamieson then sings, solo, the Snoop verse's first eight bars, which set up the middle eight—multiple singers and synth at high pitch—and then Folds sings, solo, the last six bars till just short of their cap, added by Reynolds. His three, four count cues united singing of the Snoop chorus. Folds then sings Dre's verse again—yet atop brighter keys and livelier drums—this time with backing, accenting vocals. Dre's verse again closes as the Dre chorus. The very beat after it, its first line/bar becomes a refrain—Bitches can't hang with the streets—sung every other bar till song end. (In the rap song, the beat after Snoop's final hook recital starts Dre's refrain, every fourth bar till song end, Bitches ain't shit.)

Release 
Between the February 1 release of Songs for Silverman's lead single "Landed" and the album's April 26 release, Folds bypassed record labels to directly issue "Bitches Ain't Shit," on March 8, by only Apple's iTunes. Soon, his own website presold "Bitches Ain't Shit" on a forthcoming, expanded album version on vinyl, an LP record. And it was the B side of the "Landed" single's vinyl edition, the 7'' or 45 RPM format. By then, these appeared to be "unusual marketing ideas." "Bitches Ain't Shit" is also on his October 2006 compilation album of covers, Supersunnyspeedgraphic, the LP. Playing live, rather, "Ben Folds sitting at a piano evokes an old-fashioned crooner or lounge act."

Reception 
In 2007, across June into August, John Mayer toured America with two Grammy Awards for his Continuum as the prior year's best pop album with a best pop song, "Waiting on the World to Change." On that tour, up to 15 000 per arena, an opener was Ben Folds, who, father of twins, age 7, and nearing divorce, had just completed his own tour.  Folds admits that he was causing problems on the tour, and that "the biggest problem" was otherwise, or elsewhere, "a very successful single."  Mayer's fans reliably booed "Bitches Ain't Shit."  Feigning bewilderment by the scorn, as if it had made him lose track, Folds would replay the song till the crowd quieted or, as he urged, sang along.

Whereas many cover versions succeed unto themselves, the irony of this one—swapping genres, subcultures, and largely races—partly relies on recognition of the original song, gangsta rap. Folds recalls, however, that the John Mayer crowds, not angered by the word niggas—which the piano ballad renders ostentatious—disdained the curse words and lewdness, especially the fellatio lyrics.  Since the demographic was, like his own, whites of middle class, Folds deemed the scorn trivial and felt Fuck 'em.  In 2019, stating uncertainty how to explain this, Folds called it "childish," and likened it to chronically pushing on a sore tooth, "something in the human psyche that just doubles down."

Some others felt that Folds was belittling a rap classic. In 2019, Folds recalled that the "most compelling argument" he ever saw was between his friend Eef Barzelay of Clem Snide and Michael Doughty of Soul Coughing, two musicians, yet Folds perhaps did not clarify Doughty's complaint in this debate via internet.  Questlove, visiting Folds, admired the artistic respect paid to the original. A rock critic calls the rap song, which closes Dr. Dre's 1992 album, "a sumptuous slice of Olympic-level sexism that's almost as memorable as Ben Folds' emotional, piano-ballad version." "When it came out," Folds says, "I remember bouncers—big black dudes with bald heads standing right in front of me while I'm playing—they'd hear the lyrics to Dr. Dre and they're like, 'Yeah!' They thought that was great."

Altogether, whatever offensiveness by the cover version was trivial until about 2010. By 2020, Folds had had five songs on Billboard's popular charts, starting in 1998 with his breakthrough his "Brick" and into 2015.  Both in 2005, two of the five songs reached the main popular songs chart, the Billboard Hot 100. "Landed," highly promoted by Epic Records' major label Sony Music, on the Hot 100 for two weeks, peaked on February 26 at #77. The other, "featuring" bass guitarist Jared Reynolds and drummer Lindsay Jamieson as "Mr. Reynolds" and "Lin-Z," a rendition ironically sentimental, "had spread by word of mouth and was now doubling my audiences," if regrettably raising share of "drunken college boys," Folds recalls. "Bitches Ain't Shit," on the Hot 100 for the one week ending April 2, placed #71.

"The cackles and singing from the audiences," writes a researcher, "suggest that they are hailed by the song, welcomed in, and engaged to be a part of it. And they like it." In gist, "the collision" of character's role versus performer's mold bares "the network" of unseen implications. Prefacing an April 2007 performance, Folds recalled "one nasty letter" and a few times of almost been beaten up, "once by a kind of uptight hippie woman who said it was demeaning to women." He referred her to "the lyrics department"—Dr. Dre—while her daughter, age 13, "apparently loves the song." At this Michigan State University show, the first line, Bitches ain't shit, drew a male yell So true!, yet the reception, eager and joyous, was evidently led by female voices. This remained so in April 2017 at a theater in Eastern Pennsylvania. In 2008, book publisher Rough Guides anthologized the song in the Best Music You've Never Heard.

Rejection 
A 2005 album review recalls, about Ben Folds, "his tricksy piano songs were the first to teach us that alt.rock didn't need to arrive strapped to a Marshall amp." Perhaps likewise, "Folds has always been defined by what he is not—not hip, not fresh, not underground"—till Songs for Silverman, "more mature," lent "solid core to his musings." His solo debut or 2001 album's title track, "Rockin' the Suburbs," evoked nonidentity by satirizing him as a white male of middle class. Yet after 2009, that "identity" plus "scrutiny" of his old songs found they "aren't terribly reassuring to feminist listeners." In a 1998 issue of Bitch, a writer sensed in Folds fans a type "who feels threatened by feminist empowerment."

By December 2008, artfully feigning clubhouse ladies, the a capella choir of Columbia University's women's college, Barnard College, sang Folds's "Bitches Ain't Shit." Feminist sociologist Michael Kimmel showed the video to his colleague Lisa Wade in 2010. At feminist Jezebel.com, she aired the "appropriation," an "example of resistance" by "race, class, and gender contradictions" to "mock the original"—"Dr. Dre's"—and "expose it as grossly misogynistic." In December, near Barnard, Folds covered Kesha's new song "Sleazy." A Village Voice writer endorsed "wincing," called ironic covers "a problem right now, generally," and said he "perhaps mercifully" omitted the Dre cover, "way more problematic."

In 2012, the "violence and aggression" entry in Encyclopedia of Gender in Media linked rocker Ben Folds to rapper Eminem as music's vent of "white boy pain"—an "ideology" that "feminist backlash theory" alleges as heterosexual white men's falsely feeling victimized and thus attacking women, queers, and nonwhites for progress since 1960—while Slate.com editor L. V. Anderson, to reexplain Folds's popularity, cited "musical prowess," leftward "politics," and "identity" in "the trials and tribulations" of straight, white males of middle class. No longer fond, she claimed his breakthrough hit, "Brick"—whose 1997 album was reissued in 2005—"feels exploitative and seems to dehumanize Folds' former girlfriend."

L. V. Anderson, adding "empathy" for herself lacking "perspective" in 1998, says that at 15, herself unblighted but "unhappy" and a straight white of middle class, she—who maybe "wasn't Folds' exact target audience"—wanted insight on "the opposite sex." His songs, allegedly, "don't hold up to scrutiny." They, "condescending" or "appropriating other people's struggles," commit "mansplaining" and "unsolicited advice," while 2005 track "Late," for a dead friend, is "troubling," "astonishingly presumptuous." His "entirely unserious songs," like "Song for the Dumped," are "unsuccessful," as maybe Folds—or many a fan—"really believes that paying for dates entitles a man to a woman's sex and affection," she fears.

"Even more disquieting" to editor Anderson is "Rockin' the Suburbs"—Folds, in it, "mocking his own lack of urban credibility," "before dismissing concerns about racism by asserting that slavery 'wasn't my idea' "—which, she feels, "reads as the musical manifestation of an enormous chip on his shoulder. Similarly offensive is Folds' slow, acoustic cover of Dr. Dre's 'Bitches Ain't Shit,' which was part of an ugly mini-trend in alternative pop." "Like 'Rockin' the Suburbs,' this bit of quasi-minstrelsy ostensibly pokes fun at Folds' whiteness, but comes across as sneeringly chauvinistic." From 2015 to 2020, others accused his Dr. Dre cover of "toxic masculinity," "cultural appropriation," and being "deeply problematic."

Folds says "the part I chose to excerpt skews sad," lacking "most of" the "misogynistic rant" of Dre's song—which, beyond "serious stuff," has "Quentin Tarantino" and "comedy in it"—while his "white voice" sings at slower tempo atop "sad chords" and "heartfelt melody." Amy Cook, chair of theatre arts, in 2018 prefaced, "I analyze the performance of the same song by two different artists." White, female, Cook enjoyed introjecting them. Still, "the artsy white man at the piano," she "felt," had "masked a troubling experience." "Folds is trespassing into Dre's gangsta character in order to point out that the song is both sad and funny" via, she wrote, "the all-access pass granted him by his whiteness."

Meanwhile, a major radio station held a benefit show where, backstage, a planner forbade "Bitches Ain't Shit" from Folds, who then said "you should've told us that before we flew in to do it." She asked Folds to "do the right thing." Taking the stage, he cued his bassist, "Let's open with it." Mötley Crüe drummer Tommy Lee, the master of ceremony, "thought it was amazing," Folds recalls but reveals, "They all leave in droves." "So what was gained, you know?" "I don't play it anymore because things are so explosive in the United States." "I feel bad for anyone who isn't white, who would have to experience that." "It wasn't like that when it came out." Yet even in 2017, it had been joyously greeted at his own concert.

Retirement 
In 2008, on June 5, in Lawrence, Kansas, at Clinton State Park, in the Wakarusa Festival—including Emmylou Harris, the Flaming Lips, Cake, and others—Ben Folds announced playing but then retiring "Bitches Ain't Shit." Nine days later, June 14, in Manchester, Tennessee, at the Bonnaroo Music Festival, however, he again played "Bitches Ain't Shit," and again announced its retirement. Yet 13 days later, on June 27, in England, within Somerset county, village Pilton, on Worthy Farm, at the Glastonbury Festival, he played it, and retired it, again. Then on July 5, in Germany, within the Westphalia region, city Bonn, on a flood plain of river Rhine, in the music festival Rheinkultur, he again played "Bitches Ain't Shit." The next day, he retraced to a confused interviewer these steps that had, decisively, "brought it out of retirement."

Folds explained that at Wakarusa, in Kansas—the first time they "retired it"—"I just felt like we had played it enough." But at Bonnaroo, in Tennessee, "I just looked out on the faces of all the children, and I just thought it wasn't fair that they didn't get to sing that." Folds recalled himself "choked up when we retired 'Bitches Ain't Shit' at Bonnaroo." But then, "when we played Glastonbury, I didn't want to give the children of America something that I didn't offer to the British kids, too." There, "to bring it out of retirement like that was somehow even more moving for me." "Then it went back into retirement." Folds sums up, "then it's just one thing leads to another and now we're in Germany and I felt like I need to bring it out, too, because I didn't want to offend the Germans." "So," Folds capped, "it's been an emotional roller coaster." "So," the interviewer quipped, "it's now the Michael Jordan of your live set."

Folds reportedly still had "Bitches Ain't Shit" in his live sets in 2015. He played it as recently as April 2017. Yet by 2019, Folds ceased to perform the song—which had "never got easier for me to sing," and "always felt so very wrong", although "that was also part of what made it interesting"—and while it was "regularly requested," had chosen to ignore these requests. Folds partly explains that one time, when playing the cover, "I saw a black couple pretty near me, and I'm like, 'How would I feel with the whole audience singing the N word?' Yes, 10 years ago it wasn't a big deal, but now it is a big deal, because they're being especially targeted." Folds altogether reasons, about the word niggas in 2019, "just because I'm an old man, and I can remember when you could say this, doesn't mean I need to make five people in the audience feel threatened, or terrible, or somehow less than. Anytime you're doing that, you're doing the wrong thing."

His memoir, released in July 2019, imparts, "Music should work to ease social tensions, not throw gasoline on the fire, even inadvertently." In August, he elaborated, "I had to stop playing it because—and I've had a lot of African Americans tell me this—they don't like to go out to big events with lots of white people." In a November interview, he speculated about "someone that wasn't white, in my audience, hearing a bunch of white people singing the N word—and in this climate?" Folds estimated, "they might feel like they need to run for the exit." And in 2020 on June 24, amid America's sociopolitical upheaval via the George Floyd protests and the Black Lives Matter movement's nationally pressing allegations of ubiquitous racism violating blacks, Ben Folds on Facebook announced plan to ask the record label, as soon as possible, "to take the next step and remove the recording from any streaming platforms where it has been placed." The next day, he issued his a new song, "2020."

Notes

1992 songs
2005 singles
Dr. Dre songs
Snoop Dogg songs
Songs written by Dr. Dre
Songs written by Daz Dillinger
Songs written by Jewell (singer)
Songs written by Kurupt
Songs written by Snoop Dogg
Songs written by The D.O.C.
Song recordings produced by Dr. Dre
Ben Folds songs
Gangsta rap songs
G-funk songs
Diss tracks
Obscenity controversies in music